Since the inception of the English football league competition, the Premier League, in 1992, more than 200 players have scored three goals (a hat-trick) or more in a single match. The first player to achieve the feat was Frenchman Eric Cantona, who scored three times for Leeds United in a 5–0 victory over Tottenham Hotspur. Twenty-one players have scored more than three goals in a match; of these, five players, Andy Cole, Alan Shearer, Jermain Defoe, Dimitar Berbatov and Sergio Agüero have scored five. Sadio Mané holds the record for the quickest Premier League hat-trick, netting three times for Southampton against Aston Villa in 2 minutes 56 seconds, breaking Robbie Fowler's record. Six hat-tricks have been achieved in under 10 minutes; in addition to Mané and Fowler's, Defoe, Gabriel Agbonlahor, Ian Wright, and Andy Carroll have scored the quickest hat-tricks. In 1999, Manchester United player Ole Gunnar Solskjær scored four goals in twelve minutes as a substitute against Nottingham Forest, "the fastest scorer of a four-goal haul on record in England".

The fixture between Arsenal and Southampton at Highbury in 2003 saw both Jermaine Pennant and Robert Pires score a hat-trick for the home team. In 2007, Blackburn's Roque Santa Cruz and Wigan's Marcus Bent both scored hat-tricks in a match that Wigan won 5–3. In 2019, both Ayoze Pérez and Jamie Vardy scored hat-tricks as Leicester City defeated Southampton 9–0. In 2022, Manchester City's Erling Haaland and Phil Foden scored hat-tricks in a 6–3 victory over Manchester United in the Manchester derby. Only six players – Les Ferdinand, Ian Wright, Didier Drogba, Wayne Rooney, Erling Haaland and Harry Kane (twice) – have scored hat-tricks in two consecutive league games, while Thierry Henry achieved it in consecutive appearances a month apart.

Rooney's hat-trick on 10 September 2011 and Matt Le Tissier's hat-trick on 19 August 1995 were scored through set pieces, which consists of penalty kicks and direct free kicks. Everton's Duncan Ferguson and Salomón Rondón of West Bromwich Albion are the only Premier League players to have scored a hat-trick of headers. 35 different players have scored a "perfect" hat-trick in the Premier League since its inception, but only two players have achieved this feat more than once: Robbie Fowler has scored three (all for Liverpool) and Yakubu has scored two (one each for Blackburn Rovers and Everton).

Sergio Agüero has scored three or more goals twelve times in the Premier League, more than any other player. Alan Shearer is second with eleven hat-tricks; Robbie Fowler has scored nine, and Henry, Kane and Michael Owen have each scored eight hat-tricks. Five players have each scored hat-tricks for three different clubs: Yakubu (Blackburn, Everton and Portsmouth); Nicolas Anelka (Arsenal, Chelsea and Manchester City); Kevin Campbell (Arsenal, Everton and Forest); Les Ferdinand (Newcastle United, Queens Park Rangers and Tottenham) and Teddy Sheringham (Manchester United, Portsmouth and Tottenham). Four players have scored hat-tricks and still ended up on the losing side: Matt Le Tissier (twice), Dion Dublin, Roque Santa Cruz and Dwight Yorke.

The youngest player to score a Premier League hat-trick was Michael Owen for Liverpool, when he scored his first league hat-trick against Sheffield Wednesday on 14 February 1998 at the age of 18 years and 62 days. The oldest scorer of a Premier League hat-trick is Teddy Sheringham with an age of 37 years and 146 days playing for Portsmouth against Bolton Wanderers on 26 August 2003.

The Dubious Goals Committee has sometimes decided after a match that players have not scored hat-tricks because one of the goals was incorrectly credited to them. Southampton player Egil Østenstad was thought to have scored a hat-trick against Manchester United in 1996, but the committee ruled that one of the goals be credited as an own goal to United's Phil Neville. Anelka's first goal for Manchester City in September 2002 was later credited as an own goal to Everton's Tomasz Radzinski. Javier Hernández was denied a hat-trick against Aston Villa in November 2012 after the committee ruled his second goal was actually an own goal by Ron Vlaar.

Hat-tricks

Multiple hat-tricks
The following table lists the number of hat-tricks scored by players who have scored at least two hat-tricks.

Players in bold  are still active in the Premier League.

Hat-tricks by nationality
The following table lists the number of hat-tricks scored by players from a single nation.

Notes

 The Premier League, created in 1992, is the top tier of English league football.

References

External links

Hat-tricks
Hat-tricks
Premier League
Association football player non-biographical articles